"How Was I To Know" is a song written Stephony Smith, Cathy Majeski and Sonny Russ, and recorded by American country music singer Reba McEntire.  It was released in December 1996 as the second single from the album What If It's You.  The song reached the top of the Billboard Hot Country Singles & Tracks chart.

Chart positions

Year-end charts

References

1996 singles
Reba McEntire songs
MCA Records singles
Songs written by Sunny Russ
Songs written by Stephony Smith
Songs written by Cathy Majeski
1996 songs